The 1994–95 I-Divisioona season was the 21st season of the I-Divisioona, the second level of Finnish ice hockey. 12 teams participated in the league, and SaiPa Lappeenranta won the championship.

Regular season

External links 
 Season on hockeydb.com

I-Divisioona seasons
Fin
2